Peter R. Neumann (born 4 December 1974) is a German journalist and academic who frequently appears on radio and television as an expert on terrorism and political violence. He is the Founding Director of the International Centre for the Study of Radicalisation and Political Violence as well as Professor of Security Studies at the War Studies Department of King's College London.

Early life and career
Before becoming an academic Neumann worked in Germany as a radio journalist. According to his biography he 'went to university in Berlin, Belfast and London. He received an MA in Political Science from the Free University of Berlin and a PhD in War Studies from King's College London.'

Career

Career in academia
Neumann's German language book on the IRA, IRA: Langer Weg zum Frieden (The Long Way to Peace) was published in 1999 and republished in 2002.

In November 2003 Palgrave Macmillan published Neumann's second book Britain's Long War: British Strategy in the Northern Ireland Conflict 1969-98, which explored the strategy of the British Government in Northern Ireland from its intervention in 1969 to the Belfast Agreement in 1998.

In 2003 he was granted an 'Early Career Fellowship' by the Leverhulme Trust for research entitled 'Going political: terrorism and electoral politics'.

In March 2005 Neumann also acted as senior advisor to the National Policy Forum on Terrorism, Security and America's Purpose, which took place in Washington D.C in September 2005.

Neumann was director at the Centre for Defence Studies at King's College London from 2005-7 and was then appointed as Director of The International Centre for the Study of Radicalisation and Political Violence (ICSR); a terrorism research institute based at King's College London. The Centre has been at the forefront of influential new approaches to the study of terrorism, notably radicalisation and recruitment online. Their report, Caliphate in Decline, accounted for ISIS income and challenged the traditional 'countering terrorist finance' framework as being less relevant for a group like ISIS that - at the time - controlled large areas of land.

Political activities
Ahead of the North Rhine-Westphalia state elections in 2017, Neumann served as adviser to Christian Democratic Union of Germany (CDU) candidate Armin Laschet.

In October 2019, Neumann was criticised for spreading a false story about Michael Gove comparing the European Union to the USSR to a German audience amidst widespread heckling.

Ahead of the 2021 elections, CDU chairman Armin Laschet included Neumann in his eight-member shadow cabinet for the Christian Democrats’ campaign.

Other activities
 Federal Criminal Police Office (BKA), Member of the European Expert Network on Terrorism Issues
 International Centre for the Study of Radicalisation and Political Violence (ICSR)
 Center on Global Counterterrorism Cooperation, a project of the Fourth Freedom Forum, Advisor

Publications

Publications
 Peter R. Neumann 'Europe’s Jihadist Dilemma' Survival Vol 48, No 2 - Summer 2006 the quarterly journal of the IISS

External links 

 Professor Peter Neumann at King's College London
 Returning Jihadis: A Generational Threat - Fathom Journal, 23 November 2016

References

1974 births
Living people
Vrije Universiteit Brussel alumni
Alumni of King's College London
Academics of King's College London
Terrorism theorists